Göte Carlsson was a Swedish sprint canoeist who competed in the late 1930s. He won a bronze medal in the K-4 1000 m event at the 1938 ICF Canoe Sprint World Championships in Vaxholm.

References

Possibly living people
Swedish male canoeists
Year of birth missing
ICF Canoe Sprint World Championships medalists in kayak